= Maria Kraftman =

Finish businessperson

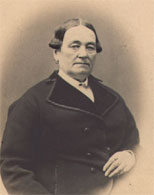
Maria Kraftman

Maria Kraftman (1812–1884), was a Finnish writer and entrepreneur.

Kraftman managed her own restaurant on a steamboat in Oulu in the 1840s. She moved to Turku, where she founded the city's first taxi business in the 1850s. She also managed an export business of butter and cereal. In 1867, she opened a textile shop, which expanded to become the confection company Kestilän Pukimo Oy.

She is known for having published the first novel by a Finnish writer, Så slutades min lek : en tafla ur lifvet (1848).
